Christopher Pinchbeck, also called Catarrón (c. 1670 – ) was a London clockmaker and maker of musical automata. He was born in Clerkenwell, England, but worked in Fleet Street. He is the most famous member of the Pinchbeck family, which took its name from a small village in Lincolnshire.

Career
In the 18th century Pinchbeck invented his eponymous alloy, a cheap substitute for gold.  He made an exquisite musical clock, worth about £500, for Louis XIV, and a fine organ for the Great Mogul, valued at £300. His eldest son, also named Christopher (1710–1783) became King's Clockmaker by appointment to George III: among his timepieces is an important astronomical clock made for the King, now in Buckingham Palace.

A number of clocks and watches made by both Christopher Pinchbecks still exist.  Nowadays the term 'Pinchbeck Watch' may mean a watch made by Christopher senior or junior, a watch made by another maker and housed in a Pinchbeck case, or a watch made by Harold Pinchbeck, the 21st-century family watchmaking business in England.

He died in 1732, at the age of 62.

Idiomatic use 

The term pinchbeck has entered the English language to signify the alloy Pinchbeck created. Because the alloy could be used to replace gold, the word is also used to signify something less than genuine; a counterfeit; a fake; a sham or fraud.

Notes

References 

 World Wide Words, Pinchbeck
 Pinchbeck family by Rita Shenton. Oxford Dictionary of National Biography (subscription or UK public library membership required)
  From 'Fleet Street:Introduction (continued)', Old and New London: Volume 1 (1878), pp 53–69.

Further reading
 

1670 births
1732 deaths
English clockmakers